Yitzhak Ernst Nebenzahl (1907–1992) was appointed State Comptroller of the State of Israel after the establishment of the state in 1948. He served as State Comptroller and Ombudsman from 1961–1981.

Biography 
Born in Frankfurt in 1907, Nebenzahl immigrated to Mandate Palestine in 1933 and settled in Jerusalem. He served as an officer in the Haganah and held senior positions in the Bank of Israel and the Postal Bank. 
In 1973 he was appointed to the Agranat Commission into the Yom Kippur War.
Nebenzahl and his wife Hildegard had four children. His son, Avigdor Nebenzahl, was the Chief Rabbi of the Old City of Jerusalem, and his daughter , served as legal adviser to the Israeli Government for most of her professional career.

References

External links
Haaretz Obituary: Plia Albeck

1907 births
1992 deaths
State Comptrollers of Israel
Israeli bankers
Haganah members
Jewish emigrants from Nazi Germany to Mandatory Palestine
20th-century Israeli civil servants